Lecce Cathedral (Cattedrale dell'Assunzione della Virgine) is the cathedral of the city of Lecce in Apulia, Italy, dedicated to the Assumption of the Virgin Mary. It is the seat of the Archbishop of Lecce.

History
The cathedral was first built in 1144, but underwent repairs in 1230. It was rebuilt in 1659 by the architect Giuseppe Zimbalo by order of bishop Luigi Pappacoda, whose remains are kept in the altar dedicated to Saint Orontius of Lecce, the patron saint of the city.

Description

Location and Exterior 

The cathedral is located in the center of the city of Lecce and sits on the southeast corner of the Piazza del Duomo. It is accessible from the piazza through two entrances, one on the north side of the building and another on the west side. The cathedral shares the piazza with other buildings, including the bell tower, the bishop's residence, and the seminary.

The principal entrance is found on the northern façade, which is considered to be a masterpiece of Baroque art.  At the center is the portal, accessible by a cascading staircase. Flanking the portal are two massive columns on square bases, outside of which are niches containing statues of Saint Giusto (on the right) and Saint Fortunato (on the left). The entablature, sitting directly above the portal, is crowned by a high balustrade alternating with columns and pilasters, above which, in the center and standing within a grand and highly decorated arch, is a statue of Saint Orontius. The western entrance, found directly across from the archbishop's residence, is divided by fluted pilasters into three vertical sections corresponding to the three naves of the interior. Statues of Peter and Paul flank the entrance. Part of the right side of the façade is covered by an adjacent diocesan building.

Interior 
The cathedral has a Latin cross plan with three naves divided by pilasters and columns, and the main altar is placed at the eastern end of the church. The central nave and the transepts are covered by a wooden ceiling with coffers created in 1685 along with paintings by Giuseppe da Brindisi which show: the Preaching of Saint Orontius, the Protection from the Plague, the Martyrdom of Saint Orontius, and the Last Supper.

The cathedral contains twelve side chapels, each with its own altar. The side chapels are dedicated to (starting on the left side of the nave):

 John the Baptist (1682)
 Nativity of Jesus which contains a 16th-century creche
 the martyrdom of Saint Giusto (1674)
 Saint Anthony of Padua (also from 1674)
 the Immaculate Conception (1689)
 Saint Philip Romolo Neri (1690) 
 the Crucifixion of Jesus and the Blessed Sacrament (1780)
 Saint Orontius of Lecce (1671)
 Our Lady of Sorrows
 Saint Giusto (1656)
 Saint Charles Borromeo 
 Saint Andrew the Apostle (1687)

They are pictorially rich with images by talented artists including Giuseppe da Brindisi, Oronzo Tiso, Gianserio Strafella, G. Domenico Catalano and G. A. Coppola.

The main altar is made of marble and gold-plated bronze, and was constructed by bishop Sersale.  It was consecrated in 1757 by bishop Sozi Carafa, who also commissioned the large central painting, the Assumption of Mary by Oronzo Tiso (1757) as well as the two lateral images of the Sacrifice of the Prophet Elias and the Sacrifice of Noah after the Flood (1758). The choir stalls and bishop's chair, made of walnut, were designed by Emanuele Manieri and were commissioned by bishop Fabrizio Pignatelli in 1797.

The 12th century cathedral crypt underwent Baroque modifications in the 16th century. It has a longitudinal space that contains two Baroque chapels with paintings that is crossed by a long corridor consisting of ninety-two columns with capitals decorated with human figures.

Bell tower 

The bell tower was constructed in 1661-1662 by Lecce architect Giuseppe Zimbalo at the request of bishop Luigi Pappacoda. It was built to replace the previous Norman bell tower, erected by Goffredo d'Altavilla, which crumbled at the beginning of the 17th century.  It has a square shape and appears to be made up of five tapered levels, the last of which is surmounted by an octagonal majolica dome, on which there is an iron statue of Sant'Oronzo. The top four floors have a single window on each side, and each has a balustrade going completely around its perimeter. Engraved on plaques located over the mullioned windows are Latin inscriptions taken from the writings of Giovanni Lecce Camillo Palma. At a height of 72 meters, the bell tower offers views of the Adriatic Sea, and on clear days even the mountains of Albania are visible. It leans slightly due to a partly sunken foundation.

References

Sources
Lecce elegia del Barocco, Michele Paone, Congedo Editore, Galatina (Lecce) 1999

External links
Diocese of Lecce official website
Inizio di un VirtualTour in QuickTime with written descriptions
Panorama of the campanile before restoration
Panorama of the cathedral entrance

Roman Catholic cathedrals in Italy
Roman Catholic churches in Apulia
Churches in the province of Lecce
Cathedral
12th-century Roman Catholic church buildings in Italy
17th-century Roman Catholic church buildings in Italy
Baroque architecture in Apulia
Roman Catholic churches completed in 1659
1659 establishments in Italy
Cathedrals in Apulia